Donovan Wisse (born February 21, 1997) is a Surinamese kickboxer currently signed with Glory, where he is the incumbent Glory Middleweight Champion.

He is ranked as the best middleweight in the world by Combat Press as of September 2022, and best by Beyond Kick as of October 2022. He's been ranked in the Combat Press top ten since June 2019.

Kickboxing career

Early career
Wisse faced Adem Bozkurt at Akin Dovus Arenasi on May 13, 2017. He won the fight by decision. Wisse next faced Erwin van de Beld at Enfusion Talents on June 3, 2017. He won the fight by a first-round technical knockout. Wisse fought the future Enfusion Middleweight champion Mohammad Ghaedibardeh on November 11, 2017. He won the fight by a second-round technical knockout.

Wisse fought Rodrigo da Paixao at the Gala Fearless. Donovan won the fight by a first round KO. Wisse returned to Enfusion for his next fight, which was against Muhammed Balli at Enfusion The Hague on May 12, 2018. He knocked Balli out in the first round.

Glory
Wise made his Glory debut at Glory 59: Amsterdam on September 29, 2018, against Kevin Van Heeckeren. Wisse won the fight by unanimous decision.

Wisse suffered the first professional loss of his career in his second Glory appearance, losing a split decision to Ertugrul Bayrak at Glory 62: Rotterdam on December 8, 2018.

Wisse's third fight with Glory came against Matěj Peňáz at Glory 64: Strasbourg on March 9, 2019. He stepped in as a short-notice replacement for Yassine Ahaggan, who was forced to withdraw due to undisclosed reasons. Wisse beat Peňáz by knockout in the second round.

Wise next faced Yousri Belgaroui at Glory 65: Utrecht on May 17, 2019. Wisse won the fight by a unanimous decision.

Wisse was booked to fight Jason Wilnis at Glory 70: Lyon on October 26, 2019. He won the fight by unanimous decision.

Wisse was scheduled to fight César Almeida at Glory Collision 2 on December 21, 2019. He won the fight by a majority decision.

Glory Middleweight champion
Wisse was booked to fight Yousri Belgaroui at Glory 78: Arnhem for the vacant Glory Middleweight Championship. He won the fight by a third-round technical knockout. A knee strike landed by Wisse opened a cut on Belgaroui's forehead, which forced the ringside doctor to stop the fight.

Wisse made his first Glory Middleweight title defense against the promotional newcomer Juri De Sousa at Glory 81: Ben Saddik vs. Adegbuy 2 on August 20, 2022. He retained the title by a dominant unanimous decision, with all five judges awarding him every round of the bout.

Wisse was expected to make his second Glory title defense against the top ranked Glory middleweight contender César Almeida at Glory 83 on February 11, 2023. The fight was downgraded to a three round non-title bout however, as Almeida missed weight by one kilogram at the official weigh-ins. Wisse won the fight by unanimous decision.

Titles and accomplishments
Glory
2021 Glory Middleweight (-85 kg) Championship
One successful title defense

Fight record

|- style="background:#cfc;"
| 2023-02-11|| Win||align=left| César Almeida || Glory 83 || Essen, Germany || Decision (Unanimous) || 3 || 3:00 || 18–1 

|- style="background:#cfc;"
| 2022-08-20 || Win ||align=left| Juri De Sousa || Glory 81: Ben Saddik vs. Adegbuyi 2 || Düsseldorf, Germany || Decision (Unanimous) || 5 || 3:00 || 17–1
|-
! style=background:white colspan=9 |
|-
|- style="background:#cfc;"
| 2021-09-04 || Win ||align=left| Yousri Belgaroui || Glory 78: Arnhem || Arnhem, Netherlands || TKO (Doctor Stoppage) || 3 || 2:10 || 16–1
|-
! style=background:white colspan=9 |
|-
|-  bgcolor="#cfc"
| 2019-12-21|| Win||align=left| César Almeida || Glory Collision 2 || Arnhem, Netherlands || Decision (Majority) || 3 || 3:00 || 15–1
|- style="background:#cfc;"
| 2019-10-26 || Win ||align=left| Jason Wilnis || Glory 70: Lyon || Lyon, France || Decision (Unanimous) || 3|| 3:00 || 14–1
|-  bgcolor="#CCFFCC"
| 2019-05-17 || Win||align=left| Yousri Belgaroui || Glory 65: Utrecht  || Netherlands || Decision (Unanimous) || 3 ||  3:00 || 13–1
|-  bgcolor="#CCFFCC"
| 2019-03-09|| Win ||align=left| Matěj Peňáz || Glory 64: Strasbourg || Strasbourg, France || KO (Straight right to the body) || 2 || 0:49 || 12–1
|-  bgcolor="#FFBBBB"
| 2018-12-08 || Loss ||align=left| Ertugrul Bayrak || Glory 62: Rotterdam  || Rotterdam, Netherlands || Decision (Split) || 3 || 3:00 || 11–1
|-  bgcolor="#CCFFCC"
| 2018-09-29 || Win||align=left| Kevin Van Heeckeren || Glory 59: Amsterdam  || Amsterdam, Netherlands || Decision (Unanimous) || 3 || 3:00 || 11–0
|-  bgcolor="#CCFFCC"
| 2018-05-12 || Win ||align=left| Muhammed Balli || Enfusion The Hague || The Hague, Netherlands || KO (High Kick) || 1 || 2:00 || 10–0
|-  bgcolor="#CCFFCC"
| 2018-01-27 || Win ||align=left| Rodrigo da Paixao || Gala Fearless || Suriname || KO (Left Hook & Knee) || 1 || || 9–0
|-  bgcolor="#CCFFCC"
| 2017-12-22 || Win ||align=left| Remy Vectol || Bloed Zweet en Tranen || Suriname || KO (Head kick) || 1 || || 8–0
|-  bgcolor="#CCFFCC"
| 2017-11-11 || Win ||align=left| Kuzey Aslan || Akin Dövüş Arenasi || Turkey || TKO (Right Cross)|| 2 || 1:30 || 7–0
|-  bgcolor="#CCFFCC"
| 2017-11-11 || Win ||align=left| Mohammad Ghaedibardeh ||  || Istanbul, Turkey || TKO || 2 || || 6–0
|-  bgcolor="#CCFFCC"
| 2017-06-03 || Win ||align=left| Erwin van de Beld || Enfusion Talents || Groningen, Netherlands || TKO (Punches)|| 1 || || 5–0
|-  bgcolor="#CCFFCC"
| 2017-05-13 || Win ||align=left| Adem Bozkurt || Akin Dövüş Arenasi || Turkey || Decision || 4 || 3:00 || 4–0
|-  bgcolor="#CCFFCC"
| 2017-04-23 || Win ||align=left| Jay Overmeer || World Fighting League 5 : Champions vs. Champions || Netherlands || Decision || 3 || 3:00 || 3–0
|-  bgcolor="#CCFFCC"
| 2016-12-27 || Win ||align=left| Joshua Karsters || Enfusion Rookies || Paramaribo, Suriname || KO (High Kick) || 1 || 2:20 || 2–0
|-  bgcolor="#CCFFCC"
| 2016-11-20 || Win ||align=left| Mohammed Rizki || Enfusion Rookies || Groningen, Netherlands || TKO (Retirement) || 1 || 3:00 || 1–0
|-
| colspan=9 | Legend:

See also 
 List of male kickboxers

References

Living people
1997 births
Middleweight kickboxers
Surinamese male kickboxers
Glory kickboxers
Sportspeople from Paramaribo